Robert B. Glenn High School (commonly known as Glenn High School) is located in the town of Kernersville in Forsyth County, North Carolina. It is laid out in a college-campus style with numerous small buildings rather than a single large building.

History 
Robert B. Glenn High School opened in the fall of 1950, under the name of the 51st Governor of North Carolina, Robert Broadnax Glenn. In 1962, it became a junior high school with the opening of East Forsyth. In 1984, it returned as a four-year high school again.

Athletics 
Glenn's athletic programs include: Baseball, Basketball, Soccer, Dance Team, Cheerleading, Softball, Cross Country, Swimming, Tennis, Football, Volleyball, Golf, Wrestling, Track, and Lacrosse.

The 1986 boys track & field team won the 4A State Outdoor Meet. The 1992 baseball team won the 1992 4A State Championship, finishing the season with a 27–2 record. Individual state championships have been won recently in wrestling.

Glenn's main rival is East Forsyth High School. In past football seasons, the Glenn-East game was one of the first games of the year. Now with both teams in the Piedmont-Triad 4A conference, it is the finale of the season.

Facilities
Glenn currently has a total of seven main classroom buildings, the newest one was built during the 2009–2010 school year and opened for the 2010–2011 school year. There are also two gyms, an auditorium, cafeteria, courtyard, dance studio, football stadium, and an office building plus a library.

Notable alumni
9th Wonder  hip hop record producer, record executive, DJ, lecturer, and rapper
Jerrod Carmichael  actor, best known as creator and lead role of NBC's The Carmichael Show
Ric Converse  professional wrestler for CWF Mid-Atlantic
Chris DeGeare  NFL offensive lineman
Ray Farmer  former NFL player and general manager
Josh Hawkins  NFL defensive back
Josh Howard  NBA player
Randy Jones  American bobsledder, competed in both the 2-man and 4-man events in four Winter Olympics
Darwin Joston  actor
Chris Lane  country music singer-songwriter
Kevin Thompson  professional basketball player
Tory Woodbury  NFL quarterback/wide receiver

References

External links
Glenn official website

Public high schools in North Carolina
Schools in Forsyth County, North Carolina